The 1944 United States presidential election in New Hampshire took place on November 7, as part of the 1944 United States presidential election. State voters chose four electors to the Electoral College, which selected the president and vice president.

New Hampshire was won by the Democratic candidate, incumbent President Franklin D. Roosevelt, who won the state over New York governor Thomas E. Dewey by a narrow margin of 4.24%. A Democrat would not carry New Hampshire again in a presidential election until 1964.

Results

Results by county

See also
 United States presidential elections in New Hampshire

References

1944
New Hampshire
1944 New Hampshire elections